Lawrence Wallace "Litz" Rusness (June 14, 1891 – October 14, 1967) was an American football coach.  He was the head football coach at Minnesota State University Moorhead in Moorhead, Minnesota, serving for two seasons, from 1920 until 1921, and compiling a record of 6–5.

Rusness was later a freshman coach and scout at Northwestern University where he was in instrumental part of the staff of head coach Pappy Waldorf.

References

External links
 

1891 births
1967 deaths
Minnesota State–Moorhead Dragons football coaches
Northwestern Wildcats football coaches
Minnesota State University Moorhead alumni